Lokendra Singh,  is a current polo player from India. He was captain of the Indian Polo Team at the World Cup. He is son of Thakur Sahib Mahendra Singh and Thakurani Sahiba Pratap Kumari, of Ghanerao. He studied at Mayo College (Ajmer).Lokendra married Bhargavi, daughter of Arvind Singh Mewar, 27 March 1995 and they have two daughters.

References 
Game for a chukker?
Ms. Bhargavi Kumari Mewar of Udaipur

Indian polo players
Polo players from Rajasthan
Living people
People from Pali district
Year of birth missing (living people)